Carlos Alberto Silva Carneiro (born 14 January 1970) is a Portuguese former road cyclist. Professional from 1991 to 2006, he notably won the Portuguese National Road Race Championships in 1998 and 1999 as well as the GP Costa Azul in 1991 and the Volta ao Alentejo in 1994. He also competed in the 1994, 1995 and 2001 editions of the Vuelta a España.

Major results
1991
 1st  Overall GP Costa Azul
 8th Overall Volta ao Algarve
1994
 1st  Overall Volta ao Alentejo
1st Stage 1
1995
 1st Stage 8 Rapport Toer
1996
 1st Stage 1 Volta a Portugal
1998
 1st  Road race, National Road Championships
1999
 1st  Road race, National Road Championships

References

External links

1970 births
Living people
Portuguese male cyclists